James May's Toy Stories is a UK documentary television series created and presented by James May, and produced by Plum Pictures for the BBC. The programme focused on bringing some of the most notable toys conceived in the past into the modern era to a "new generation of children", by putting each toy into a complex, large-scale project involving the nature of the toy. The projects, often ambitious, required an extensive team of experts, and in some cases required a large group of volunteers to help achieve the project's goal.

The programme was originally commissioned for BBC Two as a six-episode series for 2009, between 27 October to 25 December, but later received four specials after the series concluded – one in June 2011 and three more for the Christmas broadcast schedules between 2012 and 2014.

The programmes are currently available on the Naked Science YouTube channel

Format
The focus of the documentary was on six notable toys during the original series of episodes, including their history, each of which were chosen to see if they could be possibly capable of achieving a remarkable goal in real-life on a grand scale. For each toy, the nature of its purpose fundamentally underlined the project's core task, whether it was to recreate something using similar methods with the toy, or attempting push the toy with a challenge not attempted before with it. May, who had presented documentaries on toys with James May's Top Toys and James May: My Sisters' Top Toys, chose the toys to be used on the programme, and fundamentally involved people in his new programme with whom he had worked with on other projects, including Tiff Needell and Oz Clarke. The basic premise of the programme, as May put forward was:

The scale of the projects meant that the production team had to recruit specialists to provide technical assistance, including architects, designers and engineers, while in others, large teams of volunteers were required to handle construction work - an example of this was the involvement of a project involving model trains, which required volunteers to help set up a vast line of track along with connecting power supplies to it, and then dismantle it afterwards - and so appeals were made in local papers for assistance by programme researchers. Some of the projects were so elaborate, that carefully planning had to be made to ensure that each ran smoothly and did not cause disruptions within the main area it was being conducted within.

Future of construction projects
Several of the projects that required considerable construction on the programme, were later held on by various groups:

 A life-sized model of an Airfix Spitfire showcased at Royal Air Force Museum Cosford, as part of its project, was kept by the museum and put on to display until November 2009, before being mothballed until October 2010, when it was returned to Cosford's Hangar 1.
 A life-sized Plasticine garden was moved to Sudbury Hall in Derbyshire in July 2009, following its project, placed on display in the upper mall of the Octagon Shopping Centre in Burton upon Trent in February 2010, and then moved to a new home in Wolverhampton in March 2013.
 Two bridge sections made of Meccano were kept by the University of Liverpool, whose pupils had built both for its project, with one section put on public display within the university's engineering department. A motorcycle, also made of Meccano, was given to the National Motor Museum in Beaulieu following the completion of its project.

However, a project that involved constructing a house from Lego could not be preserved. An attempt to sell it to the Legoland theme park in Windsor fell apart, after the cost of dismantling and reassembling was judged too expensive, The house could not remain at its site at a vineyard because the space was needed for vines and there was no planning permission. Further attempts were unable to prevent it from being dismantled on 22 September 2009; the bricks used in it were donated to charity.

Episodes

Series 1 (2009)

Specials (2011–14)

Reception

Awards and nominations
The series was nominated in the Features category of the 2010 British Academy Television Awards, but lost out to the eventual winner, Masterchef: The Professionals.

Other media
James May released a book in conjunction with the series, through Conway Publishing (2009).

References

Notes

General references

External links
 

 
 Review of the series and tie-in toy fair by Chris Warrell from the South East London Meccano Club
 James May's Unofficial fan site

Toy Stories
2009 British television series debuts
2009 British television series endings
2000s British documentary television series
2010s British documentary television series
2011 British television series debuts
BBC television documentaries
Documentary television series about technology